Harry Broome (16 April 1904 – 1961) was an English footballer who played for Accrington Stanley, Crewe Alexandra and Mansfield Town.

References

1904 births
1961 deaths
English footballers
English Football League players
Altrincham F.C. players
Bury F.C. players
Colwyn Bay F.C. players
Bangor City F.C. players
Caernarvon Athletic F.C. players
Crewe Alexandra F.C. players
Accrington Stanley F.C. (1891) players
Mansfield Town F.C. players
Association football forwards